Bill Butler (31 July 1920 – 15 September 1986) was  a former Australian rules footballer who played with St Kilda in the Victorian Football League (VFL).

Notes

External links 
		

1920 births
1986 deaths
Australian rules footballers from Victoria (Australia)
St Kilda Football Club players